OMA or Oma may refer to:

Businesses 
 Office for Metropolitan Architecture, architecture firm founded by Dutch architect Rem Koolhaas
 Oswalds Mill Audio (OMA), a lifestyle company manufacturing horn loudspeakers and high end audio equipment

Communication
 OMA (time signal), a former Czech longwave call sign
 .oma, extension for files encrypted by OpenMG Audio for Sony's ATRAC3 format
 Open Mobile Alliance, a standards body for the mobile phone industry
 Optical modulation amplitude, an optical communication term
 Outdoor Media Association, the peak industry body representing the Out-of-Home advertising industry in Australia
 Outlook Mobile Access, a mobile phone email program using Microsoft Exchange Server

Engineering
 Operational Modal Analysis, a form of modal analysis which aims at identifying the modal properties of a structure based on vibration data collected when the structure is under its operating conditions

Entertainment
 OMA Awards, awards created by MTV

 Oma Ichimura (born 1977), Japanese voice actor
 Oma Irama Penasaran, an Indonesian film released in 1976
 Oma Marilyn Anona (born 1986), Nigerian multi-media personality
 One Man Army (band), a California punk rock band formed in 1996
 Only Men Aloud!, young Welsh male voice choir

Fictional characters
 Oma Desala, a character in the television series Stargate SG-1
 , a character in Japanese light novel series Chivalry of a Failed Knight
 , a character in the video game Danganronpa V3: Killing Harmony
 , a character and protagonist in the Japanese anime television series Guilty Crown
 , a character and main protagonist from the Japanese manga series Kengan Ashura
 , alternately spelled Oma Zi-O, a character and the main antagonist of the 29th season of the Kamen Rider Series, Kamen Rider Zi-O

Medicine
 Ontario Medical Association, a professional organization for physicians in Ontario, Canada
 Opsoclonus Myoclonus Ataxia, a neurological disorder also known as Opsoclonus myoclonus syndrome
 Otitis media acuta, an acute infection of the middle ear

Places
 Ōma, a town in Aomori Prefecture, Japan
 Ōma Nuclear Power Plant, in Japan
 Oma, Russia, a village in Nenets Autonomous Okrug
 Oma, Wisconsin, a town in Iron County

Transportation
 Eppley Airfield, northeast Omaha, Nebraska, by IATA airport code 
 Grupo Aeroportuario Centro Norte, a Mexican airport operating company, by Mexican stock market ticker symbol
 Omaha (Amtrak station), station code
 ICAO designator for Oman Air, an Omani airline

Other uses
 Cyclone Oma, impacted Vanuatu, New Caledonia and the Solomon Islands in 2019
 Object Management Architecture, a vision for the component software environment
 Office of Multicultural Affairs, an Australian Government agency from 1987 to 1996
 Oklahoma Military Academy, from 1919–1982, the former name of Rogers State University in Claremore, Oklahoma
 Olympic Moustakbel d’Arzew, an Algerian football team
 Open Mashup Alliance, an industry group for enterprise mashups
 Orlando Museum of Art, an art museum in Orlando, Florida
 Orthologous MAtrix, a database of orthologous genes across multiple species